Xenia may refer to:

People
 Xenia (name), a feminine given name; includes a list of people with this name

Places

United States
listed alphabetically by state
 Xenia, Illinois, a village in Clay County
 Xenia Township, Clay County, Illinois
 Xenia, Illinois, a city in Logan County now known as Atlanta
 Xenia, Indiana, a town in Miami County now known as Converse
 Xenia, Dallas County, Iowa, an unincorporated community
 Xenia, Hardin County, Iowa, an unincorporated community
 Xenia, Kansas, an unincorporated community in Bourbon County
 Xenia, Missouri, an extinct community
 Xenia, Ohio, a city in Greene County
 Xenia Township, Greene County, Ohio

Elsewhere
 Xenia Hill, in the South Shetland Islands, Antarctica

Hospitality
 Xenia (Greek), the ancient Greek concept of hospitality, translated as "guest-friendship"
 Xenia motif, the representation of a host's generosity to his guests
 Xenia (hotel), a now-defunct chain of state-owned hotels in Greece
 Xenia Hotels & Resorts, an Orlando-based hotel company

Nature
 Xenia (coral), a genus of coral
 Xenia (plants), pollen effects on seeds and fruits
 Hypolycaena xenia, a species of butterfly
 Paratephritis xenia, a species of fruit flies
 Phyllocnistis xenia, a species of moth

Vehicles
 Xenia (automobile), an American car
 Daihatsu Xenia or Toyota Avanza, a multi-purpose vehicle
 USS Xenia (AKA-51), an Artemis-class attack transport

Other uses
 625 Xenia, an asteroid
 Xenia (film), a 2014 Greek film
 Xenia (band), a former Yugoslav band
 Xenia, a book of epigrams by Martial intended to accompany gifts
 Xenia, an Emulator that imitates Xbox 360 hardware
 Xenia Orchidacea, a book in three volumes published 1858–1900, by Heinrich Gustav Reichenbach & Friedrich Wilhelm Ludwig Kraenzlin

See also
 
 Xena (disambiguation)
 Zinnia (disambiguation)